The New Zealand cricket team toured Bangladesh in September 2021 to play five Twenty20 International (T20I) matches. The matches were used as preparation ahead of the 2021 ICC Men's T20 World Cup. Initially, New Zealand were scheduled to play three T20I matches, but in May 2021, two more matches were added to the schedule. The schedule for the tour was confirmed in August 2021.

Tom Latham was named as New Zealand's captain, with Kane Williamson being unavailable due to him playing in the rescheduled phase of the 2021 Indian Premier League. A warm-up match for the New Zealand team at the Bangladesh Krira Shikkha Protisthan in Savar was scheduled to take place, but was later cancelled. The New Zealand team arrived in Bangladesh on 24 August 2021.

Bangladesh won the first match of the series by seven wickets, to record their first win against New Zealand in T20I cricket. Bangladesh then won the second T20I by four runs, with New Zealand winning the third match by 52 runs. Bangladesh won the fourth T20I by six wickets to record their first T20I series win against New Zealand. New Zealand won the fifth and final T20I match by 27 runs, with Bangladesh winning the series 3–2.

Squads

Upon the team's arrival in Bangladesh, New Zealand's Finn Allen tested positive for COVID-19. No immediate decision was made regarding the need for a replacement for Allen, with Matt Henry named as cover for Allen three days later. Following the first T20I, Allen returned to the New Zealand bubble, after providing two negative tests.

T20I series

1st T20I

2nd T20I

3rd T20I

4th T20I

5th T20I

References

External links
 Series home at ESPN Cricinfo

2021 in Bangladeshi cricket
2021 in New Zealand cricket
International cricket competitions in 2021–22
New Zealand cricket tours of Bangladesh